Adventure Alley is a themed section at Six Flags Great Adventure in Jackson, New Jersey. It opened on April 5, 2012, replacing the former Fantasy Forest section of the park.

Some of the most popular attractions in Adventure Alley are the Big Wheel, a Ferris wheel, and SkyScreamer, an  Swing ride that opened with the area in 2012.

History

Before Adventure Alley, the area it now stands on was previously the west side of Fantasy Forest from the park's opening as "Great Adventure" in 1974 until 2011. However for several years before Adventure Alley's addition, it was split up and rezoned, with Main Street added in-between.

In 2012, the west side of Fantasy Forest  was closed and transformed to Adventure Alley, with an original theme that included three new rides and attractions, as well as new restaurants and shops.

Attractions and Entertainment

Current Attractions
 Big Wheel: -tall Ferris Wheel, opened in 1974 as the world's tallest and largest Ferris Wheel. In 2009, the ride went under rehab for the park's 35th anniversary.
 Dream Street Cables: One end of the Skyway which takes riders to Frontier Adventures - Opened in 1974
 Adventure Alley Games: Formerly known as Fantasy Forest Games until 2012.
 Kingpin Bowl-A-Rama: Arcade
 SkyScreamer: An  Funtime Star Flyer opened May 23, 2012
 Fender Benders: Bumper Cars, opened August 7, 2012.
 Air Jumbo: Flying Elephants, opened May 23, 2012. Originally open in 2005 at Balin's Jungleland inside the Golden Kingdom as Royal Elephants.
 Déjà Vu: Scrambler, opened May 23, 2012. Relocated from American Adventures.

Restaurants
 Adventure Alley Snacks ~ Formerly known as Tornado Zone until 2012.
 Granny’s Country Kitchen
 Mama Flora’s Cucina

Shops
 Adventure Gifts ~ Formerly known as Jersey Shore Souvenirs until 2012.

See also
 2012 in amusement parks

References

Themed areas in Six Flags amusement parks
Six Flags attractions
Six Flags Great Adventure
2012 establishments in New Jersey